The following is a list of islands of Michigan.  Michigan has the second longest coastline of any state after Alaska. Being bordered by four of the five Great Lakes—Erie, Huron, Michigan, and Superior—Michigan also has 64,980 inland lakes and ponds, as well as innumerable rivers, that may contain their own islands included in this list.  The majority of the islands are within the Great Lakes.  Other islands can also be found within other waterways of the Great Lake system, including Lake St. Clair, St. Clair River, Detroit River, and St. Marys River.

The largest of all the islands is Isle Royale in Lake Superior, which, in addition to its waters and other surrounding islands, is organized as Isle Royale National Park. The majority of Michigan's islands are uninhabited and very small. Some of these otherwise unusable islands have been used for the large number of Michigan's lighthouses to aid in shipping throughout the Great Lakes, while others have been set aside as nature reserves. Many islands in Michigan have the same name, even some that are in the same municipality and body of water, such as Gull, Long, or Round islands.

Lake Erie

Only Monroe County and a very small portion of Wayne County have boundaries within the westernmost portion of Lake Erie. The islands in the southern portion of the county are part of the North Maumee Bay Archeological District of the Detroit River International Wildlife Refuge, while northern islands are part of Pointe Mouillee State Game Area at the mouth of the Huron River and Detroit River. Turtle Island is the only island in the state of Michigan that is shared by another state, as it is divided with the state of Ohio.

Lake Huron

Michigan is the only state to border Lake Huron, while the portion of the lake on the other side of the international border belongs to the province of Ontario. The vast majority of Michigan's islands in Lake Huron are centered around Drummond Island in the northernmost portion of the state's lake territory. Another large group of islands is the Les Cheneaux Islands archipelago, which itself contains dozens of small islands. Many of the lake's islands are very small and uninhabited.

As the most popular tourist destination in the state, Mackinac Island is the most well known of Lake Huron's islands.  Drummond Island is the state's second-largest island (after Isle Royale) and is the most populous of Michigan's islands in Lake Huron, with a population of 1,058 at the 2010 census.  While Mackinac Island had a population of 492, there are thousands more seasonal workers and tourists during the summer months.

Lake Michigan

Michigan only has islands in Lake Michigan in the northern portion of the lake. There are no islands in the southern half of Lake Michigan. Some of the smaller islands surrounding Beaver Island are part of the larger Michigan Islands National Wildlife Refuge.

Lake Superior

Lake Superior is the largest of the Great Lakes, and the coastline is sparsely populated.  At , Isle Royale is the largest Michigan island and is the center of Isle Royale National Park, which itself contains over 450 islands.  The following is a list of islands in Lake Superior that are not part of Isle Royale National Park.  For those islands, see the list of islands in Isle Royale National Park.

Lake St. Clair

Lake St. Clair connects Lake Huron and Lake Erie through the St. Clair River in the north and the Detroit River in the south.  At , it is one of the largest non-Great Lakes in the United States, but it only contains a small number of islands near the mouth of the St. Clair River, where all of the following islands are located.  The largest of these islands is Harsens Island, and all the islands are in Clay Township in St. Clair County.

Detroit River

For its entire length, it carries the international border between the United States and Canada. Some islands belong to Ontario in Canada and are not included in the list below. All islands on the American side belong to Wayne County. Portions of the southern portion of the river serve as wildlife refuges as part of the Detroit River International Wildlife Refuge. The largest and most populous island is Grosse Ile. Most of the islands are around and closely connected to Grosse Ile.

St. Marys River

The St. Marys River connects Lake Superior and Lake Huron at the easternmost point of the Upper Peninsula.  It carries the international border throughout its length, and some of the islands belong to neighboring Ontario.  The largest of Michigan's islands in the river are Sugar Island and Neebish Island.  Wider portions of the river are designated as Lake George, Lake Nicolet, and the Munuscong Lake.  The whole length of the Michigan portion of the river is part of Chippewa County.

Inland islands

Michigan has numerous inland lakes and rivers that also contain their own islands.  The following also lists the body of water in which these islands are located.  Five islands below (* and highlighted in green) are actually islands within an island; they are contained within inland lakes in Isle Royale.

Grand Lake

Grand Lake is a large  lake in Presque Isle County. While it is not the largest inland lake in Michigan, it does contain the most inland islands that are officially named. Grand Lake contains 14 islands, of which Grand Island is by far the largest.

See also
Geography of Michigan
Great Lakes
Islands of the Great Lakes
Populated islands of the Great Lakes
Islands of the Midwest
List of islands in Isle Royale National Park
List of islands in the Detroit River
List of Michigan islands in Lake Huron
Ferries in Michigan

References

External links
Michigan place names
Michigan municipality boundaries

Michigan
Islands